The 2020–21 CAF Confederation Cup group stage started on 10 March and ended on 28 April 2021. A total of 16 teams competed in the group stage to decide the eight places in the knockout stage of the 2020–21 CAF Confederation Cup.

Draw
The draw for the group stage was held on 22 February 2021, 13:00 GMT (15:00 local time, UTC+2), at the CAF headquarters in Cairo, Egypt. The 16 teams, which consist of the 15 winners of the play-off round of qualifying and defending champions RS Berkane, were drawn into four groups of four.

The teams were seeded by their performances in the CAF competitions for the previous five seasons (CAF 5-Year Ranking points shown in parentheses). Each group contained one team from each of Pot 1, Pot 2, Pot 3, and Pot 4, and each team was allocated to the positions in their group according to their pot.

Notes

Format
In each group, teams play against each other home-and-away in a round-robin format. The winners and runners-up of each group will advance to the quarter-finals of the knockout stage.

Tiebreakers
Teams are ranked according to points (3 points for a win, 1 point for a draw, 0 points for a loss). If tied on points, tiebreakers are applied in the following order (Regulations III. 20 & 21):
Points in head-to-head matches among tied teams;
Goal difference in head-to-head matches among tied teams;
Goals scored in head-to-head matches among tied teams;
Away goals scored in head-to-head matches among tied teams;
If more than two teams are tied, and after applying all head-to-head criteria above, a subset of teams are still tied, all head-to-head criteria above are reapplied exclusively to this subset of teams;
Goal difference in all group matches;
Goals scored in all group matches;
Away goals scored in all group matches;
Drawing of lots.

Schedule
The schedule of each matchday is as follows. Kick-off times are fixed at 13:00, 16:00 and 19:00 GMT.

During the Islamic holy month Ramadan (12 April – 12 May), CAF gave clubs the option to play their home matches late in the day to avoid having large number of players fasting during matches.

Groups

Group A

Group B

Group C

Group D

Notes

References

External links
CAFonline.com

2
March 2021 sports events in Africa
April 2021 sports events in Africa